Emily Marie Piriz (born January 28, 1996) is an American singer from Miami, Florida, who finished in 12th place on the thirteenth season of American Idol in 2014. She was also a semi-finalist on the second season of La Voz in 2020. She also auditioned for the first season of The X Factor.

American Idol

Post-Idol
Piriz released her debut single, "One of Those Nights", on November 15, 2014. On February 13, 2019, she and David Diaz released a cover of "Like to Be You" (which was originally recorded by Shawn Mendes and Julia Michaels) as a single. She was a semi-finalist on the second season of La Voz.

Discography

Singles

As featured artist

References

1996 births
Musicians from Miami
Musicians from Orlando, Florida
21st-century American singers
The X Factor (American TV series) contestants
American Idol participants
Living people
21st-century American women singers
Bishop Moore High School alumni